Home Place is a neighborhood within the city of Carmel, Indiana, in the United States. However, in June 2016, a special judge ruled that residents of Home Place had failed to meet all the requirements to prevent the annexation, and that Carmel could move forward with the annexation. After that decision was upheld by the Indiana Court of Appeals in October 2017, representatives of the Home Place residents reached an agreement with city leaders. On March 1, 2018, Carmel completed the annexation of the Home Place community.

History
Home Place was laid out in 1914 along the Union Traction interurban line between Indianapolis and points north. Although officially annexed by Carmel in 2018, Home Place did retain its historical Indianapolis postal code. Mail is delivered by the Nora, Indianapolis post office, in neighboring Marion County, Indiana.

References

Populated places in Hamilton County, Indiana